Acat or ACAT may refer to:

Military
"Avoid, Control, Accept, or Transfer", a catchphrase used in Risk Management as taught in the US Department of Defense
Acquisition Category, a term from the US Department of Defense Instruction 5000.02 - Operation of the Defense Acquisition System; see Glossary of military modeling and simulation

Science
KAAS 
Acetyl-coenzyme A acetyltransferase, an enzyme
Acyl-CoA:cholesterol acyltransferase, an intracellular protein involved in cholesterol metabolism
ACAT1 mRNA, a messenger RNA molecule

Other uses
Acat (deity), a Mayan god of tattooing
International A-class catamaran ("A-Cat"), a type of sailing craft
Alberta Council on Admissions and Transfer, an educational organization
Automated Customer Account Transfer Service, a financial securities transfer system
Assistive context-aware toolkit, the open-source input method used by Stephen Hawking.